Kickxellomycotina is a fungus grouping. In the subkingdom of Zoopagomyceta .

The name was changed from "Harpellomycotina", because "Kickxellomycotina" had an older stem. It came from the genus Kickxella, named after Jean Kickx.

Orders include Asellariales, Kickxellales, Dimargaritales, and Harpellales.

Taxonomy
Taxonomy based on the work of Wijayawardene et al. 2019.

Subphylum Kickxellomycotina Benny 2007 [Harpellomycotina Doweld 2014]
 Class Dimargaritomycetes Tedersoo et al. 2018
 Order Ramicandelaberales Doweld 2014
 Family Ramicandelaberaceae Doweld 2014
 Order Dimargaritales Benjamin 1979
 Family Spinaliaceae Doweld 2014
 Family Dimargaritaceae Benjamin 1959
 Class Kickxellomycetes Tedersoo et al. 2018
 Order Barbatosporales Doweld 2014
 Family Barbatosporaceae Doweld 2014
 Order Spiromycetales Doweld 2014
 Family Spiromycetaceae Doweld 2014
 Order Orphellales Valle et al. 2018
 Family Orphellaceae Doweld 2014
 Order Kickxellales Kreisel 1969 ex. Benjamin 1979
 Family Kickxellaceae Linder 1943
 Clade Trichomycetalia Cavalier-Smith 1998
 Order Asellariales Manier 1950 ex. Manier & Lichtwardt 1978 emend. Valle & Cafaro 2008
 Family Baltomycetaceae Doweld 2013
 Family Asellariaceae Manier 1950 ex. Manier & Lichtward 1968 [Orchesellariaceae Doweld 2014]
 Order Harpellales Lichtwardt & Manier 1978 [Smittiales]
 Family Harpellaceae Léger & Duboscq 1929 ex Kirk & Cannon 2007
 Family Legeriomycetaceae Pouzar 1972 [Genestellaceae Léger & Gauthier 1932]

References

External links
 https://www.uniprot.org/taxonomy/451828

Zygomycota